Calamotettix is a genus of true bugs belonging to the family Cicadellidae.

The genus was first described by Emeljanov in 1959.

The species of this genus are found in Europe.

Species:
 Calamotettix taeniatus Horváth, 1911

References

Deltocephalinae
Cicadellidae genera